Otterbein Church, also known as Otterbein United Brethren Church, is a historic Methodist church near Evans, Jackson County, West Virginia. It was built in 1896, and is a single-story frame building sheathed in clapboard with a vertical wainscoting in the Late Gothic Revival-style.  It features a square tower with rectangular vents on each side, small brackets, and a hipped-pyramidal roof. Also on the property is the church cemetery dating to roughly 1864.

It was listed on the National Register of Historic Places in 1998.

References

Churches on the National Register of Historic Places in West Virginia
Carpenter Gothic church buildings in West Virginia
Churches completed in 1896
19th-century Methodist church buildings in the United States
Buildings and structures in Jackson County, West Virginia
National Register of Historic Places in Jackson County, West Virginia